General Alvear Airport  was a public use airport located  south of General Alvear, a city in the Mendoza Province of Argentina.

Aerial imagery of the airport shows the runway is marked closed. Google Earth Historical Imagery (6/6/2016), (12/10/2018) shows the runway was closed sometime after June 2016.

See also

Transport in Argentina
List of airports in Argentina

References

External links 
OpenStreetMap - General Alvear Airport - Closed

Airports in Argentina
Defunct airports
Mendoza Province